Zdeslav or Zdislav may refer to:

People
Zdeslav of Croatia, a Prince of Dalmatian Croatia
Zdeslav of Sternberg, Czech nobleman
Zdislav Soroko, Soviet canoer
Zdeslav Vrdoljak, Croatian water polo player

Places
Zdeslav, a village and part of Čistá (Rakovník District), Central Bohemian Region
Zdeslav, a village and part of Poleň, Plzeň Region

See also
Zdeslava
Zdzisław (given name)

Slavic masculine given names
Croatian masculine given names